The blue-winged laughingthrush (Trochalopteron squamatum) is a bird in the family Leiothrichidae. It is found in Eastern Himalaya, Yunnan, Myanmar and Laos where its natural habitat is subtropical or tropical moist montane forests.

References

External links
 Hear the call sounds here

blue-winged laughingthrush
Birds of Eastern Himalaya
Birds of Yunnan
Birds of Myanmar
Birds of Laos
blue-winged laughingthrush
Taxonomy articles created by Polbot